Alan Myers is the name of:
Alan Myers (drummer) (1955–2013), Devo drummer
Alan Myers (translator) (1933–2010), British translator